Eleshnica is a river located in Western Bulgaria, in Kyustendil Province. It passes through Kyustendil Municipality and Nevestino. It is a right tributary of the river Struma. Eleshnica is long 59 kilometers, which makes her the 66th in length among the rivers in Bulgaria.

It serves as a natural drain to the eastern and southern parts of Osogovska planina. It is the 4th largest tributary of Struma among rivers like Strumeshnitsa, Dramatitsa (Greece) and Dragovishtitsa.

Geography 
The Eleshnica springs at an altitude of 2173 meters above sea level from Osogovo mountain, 400 meters southwest from peak Ruen (2251 meters), the tallest peak of the mountain. 

In its entirety, the river flows in a deep, weakly afforested valley. In its first 17 kilometers of riverbank, it flows parallel to the border with North Macedonia. Thereafter, it takes a turn northeast until Vaksevo village, then it turns north, and after Chetirtsi village takes a sharp turn east, and after 2 kilometers flows into the Struma at 437 meters above sea level. The river often floods during its peak water levels.

The river basin has a total area of 358 km2 which is 2,07% of Struma's basin.

Fish species can be met like Salmo macedonicus, Squalius orpheus, Phoxinus phoxinus, Alburnoides strumicae, Alburnus alburnus, Chondrostoma vardarense, Gobio bulgaricus, Barbus Cyclolepis, Barbatula bureschi, Cobitis strumicae.

Eleshnica river receives the majority of its water due to rain-snow feeding and reaches its maximum during April. The minimum amount of water in the river is reached in August. Eleshnica is the most turbid river in Bulgaria.

Settlements along Eleshnica 
Along the flow of the river, there are seven villages. 
 In Kyustendil Municipality - Sazhdenik;
 In Nevestino Municipality - Chekanets, Rakovo, Stradalovo, Vaksevo, Drumohar, Chetiritsi.

References 

Rivers of Bulgaria